Weathersfield may refer to:
 Weathersfield Elementary School - school located in Thousand Oaks, California
 Weathersfield Township, Trumbull County, Ohio — located in northeastern Ohio, near Youngstown
 Weathersfield, Vermont — town in Windsor County, Vermont

See also
 Wethersfield (disambiguation)
 Weatherfield, fictional setting of Coronation Street